Candiru may refer to:

 Candiru (fish), a parasitic fish
 Candiru phlebovirus, a virus

See also
 Carandiru (disambiguation)